ELETTRA is a research centre.

Elettra may also refer to:

Elettra Rossellini Wiedemann, American food writer
Elettra de Col, Italian curler
Italian ship Elettra (A5340)
Elettra (ship 1904)
Elettra Lamborghini, Italian TV personality in Geordie Shore and Super Shore
Elettra Stamboulis, writer and educator